Glyphipterix bifasciella is a species of sedge moth in the genus Glyphipterix. It was described by Hans Georg Amsel in 1959. It is found in Iraq.

References

Moths described in 1959
Glyphipterigidae
Moths of Asia